Michael Keating     (born 2 February 1950) is a political scientist specialising in nationalism, European politics, regional politics, and devolution. He is Professor of Scottish Politics at the University of Aberdeen and Fellow of the Centre on Constitutional Change at the University of Edinburgh.

Early life
Keating was born in North East England to Scottish and Irish parents. He holds British, Irish, and Canadian citizenships. Keating holds a BA from the University of Oxford and a PhD from Glasgow College of Technology, now the Glasgow Caledonian University.

Academic career
Keating was previously Professor of Political Science at the University of Western Ontario, Canada and between 1979 and 1988, taught at the University of Strathclyde. He has been visiting professor in the US, Spain, France, Australia, and England. From 2000 until 2010, he was on secondment from Aberdeen as Professor of Political and Social Sciences at the European University Institute, Florence, where he was head of the department between 2004 and 2007.

He is author of eighteen books and editor of another eighteen, as well as numerous academic articles and chapters. His publications include Nations Against the State: The New Politics of Nationalism in Quebec, Catalonia and Scotland (Macmillan, 1996), Plurinational Democracy: Stateless Nations in a Post-Sovereignty Era (Oxford University Press, 2001), The Government of Scotland: Public Policy Making after Devolution (Edinburgh University Press, 2005), The Independence of Scotland (Oxford University Press, 2009), Rescaling the European State (Oxford University Press, 2013), Approaches and Methodologies in the Social Sciences (edited with Donatella della Porta – Cambridge University Press, 2008), and Debating Scotland (Oxford University Press, 2017).

Awards and honours
Keating is a Fellow of the Royal Society of Edinburgh, Fellow of the British Academy, Fellow of the Academy of the Social Sciences, and Member of the European Academy.

References

External links
 profile at University of Aberdeen
 profile at the Centre on Constitutional Change

1950 births
British political scientists
Canadian political scientists
Fellows of the Royal Society of Edinburgh
Irish political scientists
Living people
Scholars of nationalism
Academics of the University of Aberdeen
Academic staff of the University of Western Ontario
Alumni of Glasgow Caledonian University
Alumni of Pembroke College, Oxford
Academic staff of the European University Institute
Fellows of the British Academy